Worstville is an unincorporated community in Paulding County, in the U.S. state of Ohio.

History
A post office was established at Worstville in 1882, and remained in operation until it was discontinued in 1904. Worstville has been noted for its unusual place name.

References

Unincorporated communities in Paulding County, Ohio
Unincorporated communities in Ohio